The FIL European Luge Championships 1935 took place in Krynica, Poland under the auspices of the Fédération Internationale de Bobsleigh et de Tobogganing (FIBT - International Bobsleigh and Tobogganing Federation in ) under their "Section de Luge", a trend that would continue until the International Luge Federation (FIL) was formed in 1957.

Men's singles

Women's singles

Men's doubles

Medal table

References
Men's doubles European champions
Men's singles European champions
Women's singles European champions

FIL European Luge Championships
1935 in luge
Luge in Poland
1935 in Polish sport